This article lists cities in Colombia by population, according to National Administrative Department of Statistics (commonly referred to as DANE in Spanish). All cities listed must have a population of at least 100,000 residents, because this is a list of cities not towns.

List

See also
 List of cities and towns in Colombia, a list that includes all the small towns in alphabetical order (instead of order of size)

References

 
Colombia
Colombia
Colombia
Cities